Bada Kabutar is a 1973 Bollywood action comedy film produced and directed by Deven Verma.

Plot
Mama Rampuri (Ashok Kumar) comes from a long line of criminals and is contemplating his latest for which he plans to enlist the services of his nephew Bhola (Deven Varma). Bhola however has had quite a few bad experiences with Mama and has been in and out of prison seven times trying to carry out Mama's mostly disastrous robbery plans. However, his mother, (Leela Mishra) does not listen to his pleas of wanting to live an honest life selling bananas or banyans and tries to inspire him by narrating the glorious deeds of his late father (her husband) who went to the prison no less than seventeen times and yet never complained. She pretends to  have heart ailment and gets herself admitted in a hospital. Poor Bhola is wrongly convinced that a large amount of money is needed for her treatment. He reluctantly joins hands with Mama who recruits club dancer Rita (Rehana Sultan) alongside his trustworthy gang members Abdul (Keshto Mukherjee) and others to plan the heist of kidnapping the only son of millionaire businessman cum antisocial smuggler Seth Dharamdas (Pinchoo Kapoor). There is also Mama's old nemesis Ghaffoor (Madan Puri) who tries to thwart his plans and harm him at all stages.

Cast
Ashok Kumar as Mama Rampuri
Deven Verma as Bhola
Rehana Sultan as Rita
Madan Puri as Gafoor
Pinchoo Kapoor as Dharamdas
Leela Mishra as Bhola's Mother
Keshto Mukherjee as Abdul
Amitabh Bachchan as Guest Appearance
Helen as Dancer

Soundtrack

References

External links
 

1973 films
1970s Hindi-language films
1970s action comedy films
Films scored by R. D. Burman
Films directed by Deven Verma
1973 comedy films